Shahzada Abdul Malek Khan (1925 - 1 April 2007) is a Bangladesh Awami League politician and the former Member of Parliament of Patuakhali-2.

Early life and family
Khan was born in 1925, to a Bengali Muslim political zamindar family known as the Khans of Kaunia based in Betagi which was under the Backergunge District of the Bengal Presidency. The family trace their origins to Qutub Khan, a soldier of Shah Shuja's army, who settled in Kaunia and was given the malikana of Buzurg-Umedpur Taluq. His father, Abi Abdullah Khan Chan Miah, was the founder of the Kaunia zamindar estate and member of the Bengal Legislative Council. His paternal uncle, Abdur Rahman Khan, was a member of the Bengal Legislative Assembly.

Career
Khan was elected to parliament from Patuakhali-2 as a Bangladesh Awami League candidate in 1973. He served as the State Minister of Industries in the Second Sheikh Mujibur Rahman cabinet.

References

Awami League politicians
2007 deaths
2nd Jatiya Sangsad members
1925 births
People from Barguna district
Bangladeshi people of Mughal descent